Kevin Krawietz and Andreas Mies defeated Jérémy Chardy and Fabrice Martin in the final, 6–2, 7–6(7–3) to win the men's doubles tennis title at the 2019 French Open. None of the four finalists had previously contested a major men's doubles final, and neither team was seeded for the tournament.

Pierre-Hugues Herbert and Nicolas Mahut were the defending champions, but Herbert chose not to participate this year. Mahut played alongside Jürgen Melzer, but lost in the second round to Krawietz and Mies.

Chardy and Martin were the fourth all-French team to reach the French Open men's doubles final in seven years.

Seeds

Draw

Finals

Top half

Section 1

Section 2

Bottom half

Section 3

Section 4

References

External links
 Main Draw
2019 French Open – Men's draws and results at the International Tennis Federation

Men's Doubles
French Open by year – Men's doubles
French Open - Men's Doubles